The oxonitridosilicates, also called sions (Si + O + N) or silicon-oxynitrides  are inorganic ceramic compounds in which oxygen and nitrogen atoms are bound to a silicon atom. A common variant also has aluminium replacing some silicon. They can be considered as silicates in which nitrogen partially replaces oxygen, or as nitridosilicates with oxygen partly replacing nitrogen.

Formation
A possible way to make these compounds is to heat metal oxides or carbonates with silicon nitride and silica in a nitrogen atmosphere.

Properties
Oxonitridosilicates have diverse structures. At the small scale silicon forms tetrahedral shapes surrounded by four oxygen or nitrogen atoms. With oxygen, one point of a tetrahedron can be bridged to another denoted O[2], or the oxygen can be a terminal atom denoted O[1]. With nitrogen, it can be shared in more ways: terminal N[1], bridged between two tetrahedra N[2], or even three or four: N[3], N[4]. With nitrogen, tetrahedra can be fused on an edge, or a point, whereas oxygen only connects tetrahedra at a vertex.

The condensation ratio, denoted by K indicates how condensed the tetrahedra are. K is the number of silicon atoms divided by the sum of oxygen and nitrogen. For SiN48− or SIO24+ K is 1/4 and it increases to 1/2 for SiO2.

Use
Oxonitridosilicates doped with europium have been used a as phosphors in white LEDs, as they convert some blue light to other colours that can mix to white.

Listing

References

Silicates
Nitrogen compounds